Naleti is a small hamlet along the left bank of Beas River. This village forms a part of Dehra subdivision of Kangra district of Himachal Pradesh, the hill state of India. Naleti comprises three revenue villages 1. Bhardyal 2. Bulla (Pandit) 3. Samdol

Demographics  
As per 2011 Census, the population of Naleti is 1382.

Geography 
Naleti is located in Dehra Tehsil of District Kangra. It is just 2 km each from Sunhet and Nehran Pukhar both located At National Highway 503.

Naleti is famous for its seven villages.

Bhardyal segment comprises Bhardiyal, Kaachh and Jakharad villages

Samdol segment comprises Buhla and Samdol villages

Naleti segment comprises Kurad (Thathla) and Upla Duar villages

The village lies in between Kulahar khadd bordering the North eastern boundary of the village and Balla khad in the South just below the Kendriya Vidyalya.

Education 
There are numerous educational institutes within the village and the close vicinity. Kendriya Vidyalaya Naleti is the prominent school in Naleti, managed by the Ministry of HRD, Govt of India.

Vedvyas campus of Rashtriya Sanskrit Samsthanam, a Deemed University run by Ministry of HRD, Govt of India is located in Balahar, which lies in Ward No 7 Masot in Naleti Village Panchayat.

Govt. Senior Secondary School Pragpur is located on the Southern border of Naleti.

State Government run Middle school and a Primary school are another centers of basic education in the village.

Eminent personalities 
Grand old man of Pahari singing, Late sh.Pratap Chand Sharma, better known as Pratapu among the folk lovers hails from Naleti. Born to Pt Jhanu Ram and Kalo Devi on 23 January 1927 and died on 26 November 2018, his famous songs are Thandi thandi hawa jhuldi..jhulde cheelan de daalu..jeena Kangra da, basoye deya melya, do nara o loko lashkdiyan talwara, goriya de angne tulsi and many more.

Renowned Sanskrit scholar Durga Dutt Shashtri was another son of soil from Naleti. His book "Raksha Sanskrit Vyakarnam" in 1948 was well-received and its 12 editions have been published so far. He also authored books "Rashtra Path Pradarshanam" (1967), "Tarjani" (1970), "Madhu Varshanam" (1972), "Vatsala", "Trinjatkam" (1982), "Vyogvallari" (1987) and "Brihatsaptapdi" (1991). Sanskrit Kalptaru, a text book brought out in three volumes, is prescribed for various Himachal schools. He translated Mahakavi Bhsas’ "Swapan Vasavdatta" and "Ikrmovashiyam", a work of Mahakavi Kalidasa, into Pahari dialect. His latest work "Sanskrit Kavya Kunjam", anthology of 27 poetic compositions of high literary excellence on varied themes, including the recent Kargil battle, had received rave reviews.

Colonel Roshan Lal, the brave soldier of Indian army also belonged to Naleti. He was involved in numerous social activities for the welfare of society including the establishment of Kendriya Vidyalya in the village.
	
Baldev Raj Sharma, the Chief advisor of Kangra Bank, Delhi belongs to Bhardial village of Naleti. He  held   many elected posts   in Kangra Bank, Delhi Asstt.Secretary, Treasurer, Internal Auditor,  Secretary  and Director (Fin. & Admin.).  In   March 1996 he was made Managing Director and continued on this post till June 2011. 
With his untiring efforts, dedication and devotion, a small Thrift and Credit Society today has become the largest Urban Co-operative Bank of NCT of Delhi serving more than 39000 members and about 120000 other clientele.  He has been the main architect of the Bank.   After his retirement from the post of Managing Director in June 2011 the Board of Directors to make use of his long experience and expertise associated him as Chief Advisor to the Board. In this capacity he has been continuing since June 2011 and guiding and advising the Board of Directors and Chief Executive Officer (CEO).  He has also been bestowed with the following five awards :-
1.
"Pride of the Country" for outstanding individual achievement and distinguished services to the nation by Chaudhary Prem Singh, Hon’ble Speaker of Delhi Assembly on 11.9.99 on behalf of Association of Industry and Business Achievements.

2.
"Meritorious service to the cause of Cooperative Movement" by Dr. Yoganand Shastri, Hon’ble Minister for Civil Supplies and Cooperation, Delhi Govt., on 20.11.99 on behalf of Delhi State Cooperative Union.  
3.
"HIMOTKARSH HIMACHALSHREE COMMUNITY UTPRERNA PURSKAR for 2005-2006" on 17/04/2006 by HIMOTKARSH SAHITYA SANSKRITI AVAM JAN KALYAN PARISHAD (REGD), UNA, HIMACHAL PRADESH, a leading voluntary organization working for the conservation of art and culture besides being engaged in other philanthropic activities for the past 33 years and enjoying patronage of renowned personalities of the country .

4.
"SULTAN SINGH LOCHAV MEMORIAL AWARD-2006" given by Smt. Shiela Dikshit,  Hon’ble Chief Minister of Delhi on 20 November 2006,  for his commendable services of more than four decades for the cause of Co-operatives in Delhi.

5.
"Most prestigious ""CHAUDHARY BRAHM PRAKASH MEMORIAL AWARD 2008-2009 " given by Smt. Shiela Dikshit,  Hon’ble Chief Minister of Delhi on 20 November 2009,   for his meritorious services rendered to Cooperative Movement in Delhi.

He has been an active member of Delhi Urban Cooperative Banks Federation for about two decades.

Dinesh Kumar Sharma, the environmentalist and Quiz master has also his roots in Naleti. He has written quiz books in science and has also been active in Environment activities. He was honored twice in 2012 and 2013 by the then Chief Secretary of Himachal Pradesh Sh Sudripto Roy for his efforts in Environment conservation. In 2014 he was again awarded at the historical Gaitey Theatre, Shimla by HP Government for inspiring the students to care for nature. He has got the distinction to represent the North zone in UNESCO conference on Education for Sustainable Development in 2014. 

He is the state coordinator of HIM IAPT Anveshika, an initiative by IIT Kanpur community to promote Physics learning through research based activities. 

In October 2021, IIT Kanpur based professor, Dr H C Verma, the eminent author of Concepts of Physics conducted NAEST examination across India and selected the super eight teachers from all over India and trained them at Kanpur. Dinesh Sharma became Dr H C Verma's super eight teammate with all India rank 4. 

Another son of soil is Rajnish Sharma, the engineer working in Indian Space Research Organisation (ISRO).

Rakesh Vashishth,hailing from this village has served as Deputy Director of Education of Bilaspur District and Shimla districts.Later he got retired as Joint Director Education in 2021.

Events
1. On 25 January 2002, a programme was organised to spread the voice of Swami Vivekananda. The programme was well attended by the eminent personalities besides the students from 43 Govt. and primary schools from Dehra      subdivision and Vedvyas campus of Rashtriya Sanskrit Sansthanam.

2. A similar programme was organised in January 2003 and a cultural retreat was incorporated presented by the students from 52 schools of Dehra subdivision.

3. On 14 January 2015, a grand yagya ahuti programme was organised here by Satya Sai Organisation on the holy day of Makar Sakranti, through 1008 Havan kunds, which was attended by over 12,000 people.

References

Villages in Kangra district